Brigadier-General Percy Robert Clifford Groves,  (26 May 1878 – 12 August 1959) was a senior British air strategist who served in the British Army and the Royal Air Force (RAF). He campaigned for substantial reform of Britain's approach to air strategy following the First World War, in particular for an immediate expansion of the RAF to parity with the largest European force within striking distance. He was an advocate of the aerial "knock out blow": the possibility of ending a war in its early stages by launching a massive attack on the enemy's centres of gravity.

Early life
Percy Robert Clifford Groves was born on 26 May 1878 at Rai Bareli, India. He was the eldest son of Joseph Groves who served as Commissioner of Railways for the United Provinces in India. He was educated at Bedford Modern School.

Career
Groves joined the King's Shropshire Light Infantry where he was commissioned a second lieutenant on 18 October 1899. He served with the 2nd battalion of his regiment in the Second Boer War, and was promoted to lieutenant on 9 March 1901. He was employed with the West African Regiment (1903–04) and was Territorial Adjutant (1909–12). In 1914 he joined the Royal Flying Corps, serving with Air Services France (1914–15). On 29 April 1915, he received his Royal Aero Club Aviator's Certificate passing on a Maurice Farman Biplane at Farman Aerodrome, Étampes. He did much active flying in the Dardanelles (1915–16).

Between 1916 and 1918, he was Chief of Staff, Royal Flying Corps, in the Middle East "which then embraced four theatres of war". In 1918 he was made Director of Flying Operations at the Air Ministry. He was then Britain's Air Ministry Representative at the Paris Peace Conference (1919) and British air adviser to the Supreme Council and the Conference of Ambassadors (1921–22).

Groves retired from active service in 1922 with the rank of brigadier general. Based on his experiences on active service, Groves realised that Britain needed to radically rethink its approach to air strategy.  Shortly after his retirement from the forces, he proceeded to campaign "for the creation of an effective striking force and for a proper regard for the patent realities of civil aviation". His opinions attracted the interest of Viscount Northcliffe and in 1922 a series of articles on "Our Future in the Air" were published in The Times.  He remained a forceful campaigner for an immediate expansion of the RAF to parity with the largest European force within striking distance.

In 1939 Groves returned to active service being made Deputy Director of Intelligence at the Air Ministry with the rank of air commodore, a position he held until April 1940.  He was then seconded to the Foreign Office before being demobilised in 1946.

Military strategist
Groves was a colleague of Frederick Sykes and Viscount Trenchard, who both influenced his early military thinking. He was also engaged in lengthy correspondence with Sir Basil Liddell Hart. In terms of his military thinking, Groves was a proponent of the aerial "knock out blow": the possibility of ending a war in its early stages by launching a massive attack on the enemy's centres of gravity.

Awards and honours
In the Second Boer War he was awarded the Queen's medal (4 clasps) and the King's medal (2 clasps).

During the First World War he was awarded the Distinguished Service Order in 1916.  In the same year he was made Order of the White Eagle of Serbia, 3rd Class with Swords.  He was made a Companion of the Order of St Michael and St George in 1918, a Companion of the Order of the Bath in 1919 and a Commander of the Legion of Honour in 1920.

Groves was an Associate Fellow of the Royal Aeronautical Society; Hon. Secretary General Air League of British Empire, and Editor of Air, 1927–29.  He was group captain and honorary air commodore, RAFVR, September 1939.

Personal life
Groves was a member of the United Service Club. In 1920 he married Suzanne, daughter of T.E. Steen of Oslo; they had one son. He died in Mombasa on 12 August 1959.

The National Portrait Gallery has numerous photographic portraits of Groves.

Selected works
 Flying over Egypt, Sinai and Palestine, National Geographic, 1926
Behind the Smoke Screen, 1934
Our Future In The Air, 1935

References

External links
Percy Robert Clifford Groves at the National Portrait Gallery
Air of Authority - A History of RAF Organisation - Air Commodore P R C Groves

People educated at Bedford Modern School
Companions of the Distinguished Service Order
Companions of the Order of St Michael and St George
Companions of the Order of the Bath
Royal Flying Corps officers
Royal Air Force generals of World War I
Royal Air Force personnel of World War II
King's Shropshire Light Infantry officers
British colonial army officers
1878 births
1959 deaths
Military personnel of British India
British Army personnel of World War I